The British Ambassador to China is the United Kingdom's foremost diplomatic representative in the People's Republic of China, and in charge of the UK's diplomatic mission in China. The ambassador's official title is His Brittanic Majesty's Ambassador to the People's Republic of China

The UK recognized the People's Republic of China in 1950, although the PRC did not agree to the exchange of ambassadors until 1972. Prior to this, the United Kingdom had sent ministers to the Qing Empire and variously ministers and ambassadors to the Republic of China. The Embassy offices have been located in Peking (Beijing), Nanking (Nanjing), or both. Currently the British Ambassador to China is Caroline Wilson, she became ambassador in September 2020.

List of heads of mission
1792–1794: George Macartney, 1st Earl Macartney
1815-1817: William Pitt Amherst, 1st Earl Amherst

Envoys Extraordinary and Ministers Plenipotentiary to Imperial China (during the First Opium War)

Envoys Extraordinary and Ministers Plenipotentiary to Imperial China (held by the Governor of Hong Kong)

Envoys Extraordinary and Ministers Plenipotentiary to Imperial China

Envoys Extraordinary and Ministers Plenipotentiary to the Republic of China

Ambassadors to the Republic of China

Chargés d'affaires to the People's Republic of China

The United Kingdom recognized Communist China in 1950 and posted a chargé d'affaires in the new capital of Beijing.  However, China was unwilling to exchange ambassadors until the British consulate in Taipei was withdrawn in 1972.

Ambassadors to the People's Republic of China

References

External links
UK and China, gov.uk

China
 
China
United Kingdom